Croatia will compete at the 2022 European Championships in Munich from August 11 to August 22, 2022.

Medallists

Competitors
The following is the list of number of competitors in the Championships:

Athletics

Gymnastics

Belgium has entered five male and five female athletes.

Men

Qualification

Women

Qualification

Rowing

Source:

Men

Women

Table tennis

Croatia entered 4 men and 3 women.

Men

Women

Mixed

Triathlon

References

2022
Nations at the 2022 European Championships
European Championships